The Sony Ericsson Xperia Active is a smartphone produced by Sony Ericsson. It runs the Android operating system. It contains similar hardware as other 2011 Xperia phones in a smaller package. The phone is marketed towards people with an 'active lifestyle', hence the name, and comes with a scratch resistant screen, dust and water resistant casing and pre-loaded fitness applications. It is small in size with a 3" touchscreen with wet finger tracking, similar to that of the Xperia Mini.

It has a two-layer removable rear cover.

See also
Motorola Defy

References

External links 
 
 Official smartphone web page from Sony Mobile web site

Android (operating system) devices
Mobile phones introduced in 2011
Sony Ericsson smartphones
Mobile phones with user-replaceable battery